The Orlovka, also known as Mamyn, is a river in Mazanovsky District, Amur Oblast, Russia.

The river basin includes the Garinskoye iron ore deposit, one of the largest in the Russian Far East, as well as gold prospecting areas. The only settlement in the river basin is Oktyabrsky, located by river Gar, the main tributary. In the past there had been other settlements by the river, such as the Slava collective farm on the left bank near the mouth, but they were abandoned.

History
The original Tungusic name of the river was replaced in 1972 under the USSR administration at the time of the renaming of geographical sites in the Russian Far East. The name "Orlovka" honors Warrant Officer Orlov, who visited the area in 1847 to trade with the local Evenks on behalf of the Russian-American Company. 

In 1999, the Orlovsky Zakaznik (Орловский заказник), a  protected area, was established in the lower basin of the river. The fauna of the state reserve includes elk, red deer, roe deer, wild boar, bear, sable, mink, lynx, otter, Oriental stork, hooded crane, mandarin duck, white-tailed eagle, osprey and greater spotted eagle.

Course
The Orlovka is a right tributary of the Selemdzha. In its upper reaches the Orlovka flows with relatively moderate speed as a mountain river with some rapids among pebbles and boulders. After its confluence with the Gar, it progresses slowly southwards in a wide floodplain, meandering through swampland dotted with small lakes. It divides into branches near the area where it joins the banks of the Selemdzha,  from its mouth in the Zeya. The mouths of the Orlovka are near Abaykan, downstream from the mouth of the Nora (river).

The river basin is almost entirely within the Amur-Zeya Plateau. The climate is harsh, with long and very cold winters.

There is patchy distribution of permafrost in the basin, the layer being closest to the surface in river wetlands with moss cover. The river freezes in mid October and stays under ice until the end of April.

Tributaries

See also
List of rivers of Russia

References

External links 
Река "мамын", перекат водопадный (in Russian)
Река Селемджа - Команда Кочующие (in Russian)
Amur Oblast - Mineral resources (in Russian)
Приложение 3. РЫБООХРАННЫЕ ЗОНЫ ВОДНЫХ ОБЪЕКТОВ РЫБОХОЗЯЙСТВЕННОГО ЗНАЧЕНИЯ АМУРСКОЙ ОБЛАСТИ (in Russian)

Rivers of Amur Oblast
Drainage basins of the Sea of Okhotsk